Sean O'Connor (born June 15, 1984 in La Crescenta, California) is a former American soccer player.

Career

College and Amateur
O'Connor attended Saint Francis High School, leading them to a CIF title in 2001 as 1st Team All-CIF Goalkeeper, played club soccer in the Coast Soccer League for the Burbank Red Machine, and played college soccer at Belmont Abbey College, where he was twice named All-Carolinas-Virginia Athletics Conference and, as captain, guided Belmont-Abbey to the 2005 CVAC championship.

During his college years O'Connor was on the roster of the San Fernando Valley Quakes in the USL Premier Development League for two seasons, but only saw action in two games in 2007, both shutouts.

Professional
Having not been drafted by Major League Soccer out of college, O'Connor played several seasons of amateur and semi professional soccer in the Los Angeles area, including coaching for the Crescenta Valley soccer club.

O'Connor attended open tryouts held by Carolina RailHawks in early 2010 and impressed head coach Martin Rennie. He was subsequently signed to his first professional contract by Carolina in March, 2010.

References

External links
 Carolina RailHawks bio
 Interview on Carolina RailHawks

1984 births
Living people
American soccer players
San Fernando Valley Quakes players
North Carolina FC players
Charleston Battery players
USL League Two players
Soccer players from California
Sportspeople from Los Angeles County, California
People from La Crescenta-Montrose, California
Association football goalkeepers